ICLEI – Local Governments for Sustainability (or simply ICLEI) is an international non-governmental organization that promotes sustainable development. ICLEI provides technical consulting to local governments to meet sustainability objectives.

Founded in 1990 and formerly known as the International Council for Local Environmental Initiatives, the international association was established when more than 200 local governments from 43 countries convened at its inaugural conference, the World Congress of Local Governments for a Sustainable Future, at the United Nations in New York in September 1990.

As of 2020, more than 1,750 cities, towns, counties, and their associations in 126 countries are a part of the ICLEI network.

As of 2021, ICLEI has more than 20 offices around the world.

Membership 
According to the organization's website, the ICLEI members "steer the direction of our work, shape our strategy and support the mission, mandate and principles set in our statutes. They are eligible to vote and take part in our network-wide governing bodies."

In 2009, ICLEI included 1,227 local government members worldwide in 70 countries, with more than 600 in the United States.  ICLEI USA membership grew by 58% in 2008 and by 25% in 2009.  U.S. local government members include cities, towns, and counties of all sizes, from New York City and Los Angeles County to Dubuque, Iowa, and Arlington, Texas.

In 2020, ICLEI counts more than 1,750 local governments within its network.

The only requirements for ICLEI membership are a self-defined commitment to climate protection and the payment of annual membership dues based on population size.

History and structure 
ICLEI was founded in 1990, with its World Secretariat headquartered in Toronto, Canada.  The U.S. office opened formally in 1995. ICLEI USA's Executive Office is based in Washington, D.C., and the World Secretariat is now in Bonn, Germany.

ICLEI was founded in 1990 as the "International Council for Local Environmental Initiatives". In 2003, ICLEI's local government members voted to revise the organization's mission, charter and name to better reflect the current challenges local governments face, and the broader topic of sustainability. The "International Council for Local Environmental Initiatives" thus became "ICLEI - Local Governments for Sustainability", with a broader mandate to address sustainability issues, not only environmental issues.

For its 30th anniversary, ICLEI adopted a new logo (released officially in February 2021) which emphasizes the organization's connections in terms of its members, offices and elements (represented by the logo's colors: water, air and climate (blue), nature (green) and cities (yellow)).

Programs
The organization promotes the following programs for local-level adoption and implementation as described on their website.

 the Rio Conventions:
 The UN Framework Convention on Climate Change,
 The UN Convention on Biological Diversity,
 The UN Convention to Combat Desertification
 Agenda 21
 the Habitat Agenda
 the Millennium Development Goals
 the Johannesburg Plan of Implementation
ICLEI also provides oversight for the Compact of Mayors, a global coalition of city leaders founded to address climate change at the local level,  as well as acting as the focal point for the Local Governments and Municipal Authorities (LGMA) Constituency, which has represented networks of local and regional governments at the UNFCCC process since 1995.

Governance

ICLEI is a democratic organization led by the ICLEI Council and the Global Executive Committee (GexCom), two groups of local leaders elected by ICLEI Members every three years. The ICLEI Council is formed by the nine Regional Executive Committees (RexCom), elected by Members in each ICLEI region.

One representative from each RexCom is then elected as a regional representative to the ICLEI Global Executive Committee (GexCom), along with portfolio holders who are elected to the GexCom by the members of the ICLEI Council based on their thematic expertise. The ICLEI GexCom and Council have the power to represent ICLEI on the global stage and steer the organization by setting ICLEI global strategy and policies.

The Council convenes every three years at an ICLEI World Congress and establishes ICLEI's priorities and direction through the adoption of a six-year Strategic Plan. The most recent ICLEI World Congress was held in Montreal from 19 to 22 June 2018. Due to the COVID-19 pandemic, the ICLEI World Congress will be held in two parts: the first one held virtually from 13 to 15 April 2021, while the second one will take place in Malmö, Sweden, in 2022. Members elect 21 representatives to serve on the Executive Committee, which oversees the implementation of the Strategic Plan and ICLEI operations.

World Secretariat directors:
 Ashok Sridharan – ICLEI President and Mayor, Bonn, Germany
 Gino Van Begin – ICLEI Secretary General, Bonn, Germany

Ecomobility

Ecomobility means travelling through integrated, socially inclusive, and environmentally friendly transport options, including and integrating walking, cycling, public transport and other climate and people friendly innovative modes of transport. By enabling citizens and organizations to access goods, services, and information in a sustainable manner, ecomobility supports citizens' quality of life, increases travel choices, and promotes social cohesion.

ICLEI's agenda promoting ecomobility in cities is titled the EcoMobile City (sustainable transport) Agenda. Under this agenda, ICLEI executes the following 3 key projects:
 EcoMobility Alliance
 EcoMobility World Festival
 EcoMobility World Congress
The EcoMobility Alliance was created in October 2011 in Changwon, Korea. It is a transformation of the earlier Global Alliance for EcoMobility, which is a non-governmental organization founded and launched in Bali on 10 December 2007, on the occasion of the 2007 United Nations Climate Change Conference (UNFCCC-COP-13). ICLEI legally represents and hosts the Secretariat of the Alliance.

Criticism
Tea Party movement activists targeted ICLEI for its support for Agenda 21, a nonbinding United Nations initiative that seeks to promote resource and land conservation. The activists claimed that local government efforts to expand public transportation and preserve open space were part of a UN conspiracy plot "to deny property rights and herd citizens toward cities".

Dan Maes, the 2010 Republican candidate for Governor of Colorado, criticized the city of Denver for its membership in ICLEI during his campaign.

ICLEI USA
The United States branch is a 501(c)(3) nonprofit membership organization of the international organization of the same name.

References

External links

International organisations based in Bonn
International sustainability organizations
Municipal international relations
Organizations established in 1990
1990 establishments in New York (state)